Professor Charles Francis Xavier, also known simply by his codename Professor X, is a fictional character primarily portrayed by Patrick Stewart, James McAvoy, and Harry Lloyd in 20th Century Fox's X-Men franchise and the Marvel Cinematic Universe (MCU) franchise produced by Marvel Studios, based on the Marvel Comics character of the same name created by Stan Lee and Jack Kirby.

In the film series' continuity, Xavier is a mutant activist and founder of the Xavier School for Gifted Youngsters, intended to house displaced or discriminated mutants while acting as an educational and training ground for cultivating their powers. With the assistance of several of his school's alumni, he eventually forms and leads a mutant strike force known as the X-Men, dedicated to carrying out his initiative for a peaceful co-existence between mutants and humanity, the latter of whom express significant phobia towards them. He is often depicted as kind, empathetic and wise in his ability to relate to his mutant brethren, and believes in a future where his race is fully welcomed into society at large, contrasted by his former friend Erik Lensherr, who works to establish mutants as dominant over humans, due to his jaded views on their co-existence being amplified by his experiences as both a mutant and Holocaust survivor during World War II. As such, Xavier's X-Men often oppose Lensherr's Brotherhood of Mutants in working towards their respective goals. In the distant future in a darker alternate timeline, Xavier would end up accidentally killing a large number of mutants, including several X-Men, due to a telepathically-induced seizure, inadvertently putting his own race at risk of extinction, and leaving him to be cared for by a world-weary James "Logan" Howlett, who is in turn assisted by him in escorting a young mutant named Laura across the Canadian border while being pursued by the Reavers, led by Donald Pierce and Zander Rice. While settling down on their objective, Xavier is unceremoniously murdered by X-24, a genetically enhanced clone of Logan created by the Alkali Corporation and Transigen Project following Laura's escape.

Xavier has been a central figure of the film series, appearing in eleven live-action feature films and one television series. Patrick Stewart plays him in the X-Men films X-Men, X2, X-Men: The Last Stand, X-Men Origins: Wolverine, The Wolverine, and Logan, while James McAvoy stars as a younger Xavier in X-Men: First Class, X-Men: Apocalypse, Deadpool 2 and Dark Phoenix (Laurence Belcher portraying him as a child in the former film), and Harry Lloyd recurs as a younger Xavier in Legion. The former two actors both play him at different time periods in X-Men: Days of Future Past. It is implied that Xavier is one of the most powerful mutants in the world. Stewart reprises his role as Xavier in the Marvel Cinematic Universe (MCU) film Doctor Strange in the Multiverse of Madness (2022); depicted as an alternate version from the X-Men films, Xavier is the leader of the Illuminati of Earth-838, and redesigned to match Cedric Smith's Professor X from X-Men: The Animated Series (1992–1997), depicted with the character's iconic green suit and yellow hover-chair. Additionally, Stewart has voiced Xavier in the video games X2: Wolverine's Revenge and X-Men: The Official Game, which tie into the film series.

Although Xavier is American-born in the comics and in animation, he speaks with an English accent in the films. First Class establishes that he lived in the United States during childhood, though his mother speaks with an English accent, indicating he may have developed his accent because of her. Stewart's and McAvoy's performances as Xavier have received a universally positive critical reception, winning a Saturn Award. Stewart had previously held the Guinness World Record for "longest career as a live-action Marvel character" alongside co-star Hugh Jackman for their respective portrayals of Charles Xavier / Professor X and James "Logan" Howlett / Wolverine in the X-Men films, before being surpassed by Tobey Maguire and Willem Dafoe, who both reprised their roles as Peter Parker / Spider-Man and Norman Osborn / Green Goblin in the MCU film Spider-Man: No Way Home (2021). Stewart alone however retook the title following his reprisal in Doctor Strange in the Multiverse of Madness.

Character creation 
The comic book character, Professor X, was first created by writer Stan Lee and artist/co-writer Jack Kirby. Professor X first appeared in X-Men #1 (September 1963). Stan Lee had stated that the physical inspiration for Professor Xavier was from Academy Award-winning actor Yul Brynner. Professor Xavier's character development was also inspired by Martin Luther King Jr., as a contrast to the views of his longtime antagonist and friend, Erik Lensherr, whose approach is considered more comparable to that of Malcolm X.

Casting
Rather than auditioning other actors, X-Men director Bryan Singer actively pursued Patrick Stewart for the role of Charles Xavier. The success of the Star Trek: The Next Generation TV and film franchises had typecast Stewart as his character, Jean-Luc Picard, and obtaining other roles became difficult. However, in the late 1990s, he accepted the role of Xavier, a role similar in many ways to Picard. He was initially reluctant to sign on to another major franchise, but his interest in working with director Bryan Singer persuaded him. While Singer worked to persuade Stewart to take the role, others who expressed interest in the part included actor Terence Stamp and singer Michael Jackson. Stewart announced that he was leaving the X-Men film franchise after Logan. After accepting an invitation to reprise his role as Xavier in the third season of Legion (a standalone television series set in the same continuity as the X-Men film series and following Xavier's long-lost schizophrenic son David Haller) by its star Dan Stevens, saying he was "Absolutely 100%" willing to reprise the role under such circumstances, it was ultimately announced that Harry Lloyd would portray a young Professor X in the third and final season; while having Stewart return as a present-day Xavier had been seriously considered by showrunner Noah Hawley, he elected the older character's presence to be unnecessary upon deciding to have the season revolve around time travel. Stewart reprises his role in the Marvel Cinematic Universe (MCU) film Doctor Strange in the Multiverse of Madness (2022) as an alternate version of Xavier who is a member of the Illuminati. Since then, Stewart revealed during an interview with ComicBook.com that he has been told by Marvel Studios to standby in case they need him to reprise the role again when asked if he would like to show up in Deadpool 3 (2024) due to his X-Men co-star Hugh Jackman returning as James Howlett / Logan / Wolverine in that film.

Fictional character biography

Original timeline

X-Men 

Xavier is first introduced in X-Men, portrayed by Patrick Stewart, when he sends Storm (Halle Berry) and Cyclops (James Marsden) to rescue Wolverine (Hugh Jackman) and Rogue (Anna Paquin) from Sabretooth (Tyler Mane). Xavier believes that the attack was caused by Magneto (Ian McKellen) and that Wolverine was the intended target. He gives Wolverine and Rogue a home in the X-Mansion (Xavier School for Gifted Youngsters), and promises to help Wolverine remember his past as long as Xavier gets 48 hours to discover why Magneto wants Wolverine. Xavier is able to control both Sabretooth and Toad (Ray Park) at the same time and speaks through them to try to talk Magneto out of his plans against humans. Xavier uses Cerebro to locate Rogue when she runs away but is poisoned when he uses it later due to it having been tampered with by Mystique (Rebecca Romijn). At the end of the film, he recovers and advises Wolverine to search Alkali Lake for answers to his past.

X2 

Stewart reprises his role as Xavier in X2: X-Men United. Upon learning that the mutant Nightcrawler (Alan Cumming) attacked the President of the United States, Xavier sends Storm and Jean Grey (Famke Janssen) to bring him in for questioning. Xavier and Cyclops leave Wolverine in charge of the school so they can visit Magneto in the plastic prison he was placed in at the end of X-Men. In Magneto's cell, Xavier learns that Magneto was brainwashed by William Stryker (Brian Cox) and forced to tell Stryker all about the school and Cerebro. Xavier realizes too late that it is a trap and is captured. He wakes up in Stryker's underground test facility, tied to a chair and fixed to a device that restricts his mental powers. He is left in the room with Jason Stryker (Michael Reid McKay), William's son and a powerful illusionist who had previously been a student at Professor X's school. Now brainwashed by his father, Jason traps Xavier into various illusions, keeping him in one where Xavier is back in the school, now completely empty, and Jason is portrayed as a scared little girl. To comfort the "girl" and find his students, Xavier goes to use Cerebro. The audience discovers that Xavier was captured to power a makeshift Cerebro created by Stryker. When Xavier's powers are magnified by Cerebro, he can locate any mutant in the world. Through intense concentration, he can kill humans or mutants. Under Jason's illusion, Xavier is tricked into concentrating on all of the world's mutants, nearly killing them. He then switches to attacking all of the world's humans after Magneto – who is unaffected due to his helmet that blocks telepathy – confronts and threatens Jason. Nightcrawler and Storm rescue Xavier from the illusion. They then fly to Washington to warn the president against the possibility of a mutant/human war.

X-Men: The Last Stand 

In X-Men: The Last Stand, Xavier first appears in a flashback, with Stewart digitally de-aged, when he and Magneto pick up a young Jean Grey as their first student. He is given a more youthful appearance using visual effects.

In the present, Xavier expresses worry over Cyclops' grief over Jean's death and tells Storm that should anything happen to him, she would replace him as the head of the school. When Jean is discovered alive, Xavier sedates her and tells Wolverine that he had kept her powers in check with mental barriers since she was a child, resulting in her developing a second personality known as "The Phoenix." When Jean awakens as The Phoenix and escapes, Xavier tracks her down to her old home and tries to convince her to return. Rather than starting a fight outside her house, Xavier lets Magneto come with him. Xavier tries to calmly talk Jean into returning to the mansion, but Magneto turns the unstable Jean against the Professor. This causes Xavier to panic and tell Jean that she is a danger to everyone, including herself. He uses the fact that Jean killed Cyclops to try to make her realize her potential for evil, but he only angers the Phoenix more. After much argument, the Phoenix manifests its great powers as she tries to keep Xavier from re-establishing the psychic blocks to imprison it again. Infuriated both by Xavier's meddling in her head and Magneto, who insinuates that Xavier wishes to restrain her and "give her the cure," she uses her mind to first lift her house into the air and then cause Xavier to explode into ashes. His death is difficult for everyone at the school, and it is nearly closed until Storm honors Xavier's wishes and acts as the school's head following the arrival of Warren.

In a post-credits scene, Xavier speaks to Moira McTaggert (Olivia Williams) through the body of a comatose man, implying that the Phoenix had not entirely killed him. Xavier was able to survive by transferring his consciousness into the body of a comatose patient. This is something he discusses at the beginning of the film as part of an ethics class, the question being if it would be ethical for a mutant like himself to attempt such a transference, noting that the man in question was virtually brain-dead.

On the DVD Commentary, it is revealed that the body on Muir Island is someone named "P. Xavier." One of the writers noted that this character is Xavier's twin brother who was born brain-dead (due to Professor X's amount of power). Since P. Xavier was born brain-dead and stuck in a coma for a long time, Charles Xavier can't walk in his brother's body and uses his old wheelchair. Xavier's return is an example of a comic book death, which refers to comic book characters getting killed off but not staying dead permanently. This scene was not in the script but was secretly added during filming.

X-Men Origins: Wolverine 

Xavier appears briefly at the end of X-Men Origins: Wolverine after Wolverine frees a group of young mutants (including Cyclops) from Stryker's Weapon X lab on Three Mile Island, with Stewart digitally de-aged. They try to escape from the facility but get lost until Cyclops hears a telepathic voice which guides them out to safety. Xavier then takes everyone into his helicopter, presumably to his school for mutants. As in the opening of The Last Stand, Patrick Stewart was digitally de-aged, and Xavier is able to walk and does not use a wheelchair. As an explanation, he might have created the illusion that he is standing in various scenes when in reality the character is only present by telepathic projection.

X-Men: First Class 

James McAvoy portrays the young Charles Xavier / Professor X in X-Men: First Class. He serves as one of the two protagonists of the film along with Erik Lensherr / Magneto (Michael Fassbender). As a young man, he befriends and adopts Raven Darkhölme (Jennifer Lawrence), later known as Mystique. He earns his doctorate after doing research on genetic mutation at Oxford, which brings him to the attention of CIA agent Moira MacTaggert (Rose Byrne). The Central Intelligence Agency provides him access to Cerebro, which he uses to locate and recruit other mutants for the government. Around the same time, he meets Erik Lensherr after saving him from drowning in a botched attempt to kill Sebastian Shaw (Kevin Bacon). Xavier and Lensherr become friends and together they located mutants for the CIA. Once the team is assembled, Shaw and the Hellfire Club attack the CIA facility, kill all the human personnel including one of Xavier's recruits, and persuade another to defect. Xavier retreats with the survivors to his Westchester, New York mansion to train them as an independent team of operatives to prevent nuclear war between the US and USSR as a result of the Cuban Missile Crisis. They defeat the threat, but Xavier is unable to convince Lensherr not to take his revenge on a helpless Shaw. During the fight, Lensherr (Magneto) redirects a series of missiles back toward the ships that fired them after the governments decided to try to eliminate the mutant 'threat.' In the film's final confrontation, it is revealed that MacTaggert causes Xavier's paralysis when she fires on Magneto, who deflects one of the bullets into his friend's lower spine. Following this, Xavier and Magneto part ways, with Xavier telling his old friend that they do not share the same dream. Xavier severs ties with the US government and changes their team name from "G-Men" to "X-Men," turning his home into a school for mutant children. In order to do this, he erases MacTaggert's memory so she cannot inform her superiors about the school's existence.

The circumstances of Xavier's paralysis caused continuity errors in the timeline of the X-Men saga, as he is seen walking in sequences taking place at least 20 years later, in a film that was released years before. As an explanation, Xavier can be seen walking in X-Men: Days of Future Past, which explains that he can do it by creating an illusion that he is standing in various scenes, when in reality, the character is only present by telepathic projection.

Laurence Belcher portrays 12-year-old Charles Xavier.

The Wolverine 

Xavier appears in the post-credits scene of The Wolverine, with Stewart reprising his role, where he appears along with a redeemed Magneto to warn Wolverine of an upcoming crisis. Amazed, Wolverine asks how he is still alive. Xavier reminds Logan that he once said long ago that Logan is not the only one with gifts. A photograph of Wolverine with Xavier also appears in Yashida's scrapbook.

X-Men: Days of Future Past 

James McAvoy and Patrick Stewart reprise their roles as the younger and older Charles Xavier / Professor X respectively, in X-Men: Days of Future Past, which was released on May 23, 2014. In the sequences set in 1973, Xavier is seen to be older and bitter, having given up on his dream of peaceful coexistence between humans and mutants after the failure of his school, and leading a reclusive life as a result. Despite having been paralyzed by Magneto in X-Men: First Class, he regained his mobility from Hank McCoy/Beast's (Nicholas Hoult) serum, but at the cost of suppressing his mutation. In addition, Xavier is living under the care of McCoy, is impolite to people, uses profane language, occasionally behaves violently, and drinks heavily to cope with his failures.

By 2023, the Sentinels have decimated the mutant race and virtually conquered Earth, forcing the X-Men to seek a new method of combating their threat. With Kitty Pryde (Elliot Page) having developed the ability to project an individual's consciousness back into their past selves, Xavier proposes that he be sent back into his past self in 1973 so that he can prevent Mystique from killing Bolivar Trask (Peter Dinklage) after he proposed the Sentinel program, believing that this death is the primary catalyst for this timeline. However, Kitty explains that the process of projecting someone's mind into the past would be too psychologically traumatic, even for Xavier to survive it, prompting Wolverine to volunteer to go back instead as his power would allow him to recover from the damage inflicted.

When Wolverine arrives to seek his help, the past Xavier is eventually inspired to strive for his goal again. As the serum suppressing his abilities begins to wear off, instead of taking his next dose, Xavier accepts Wolverine's encouragement to read his mind, allowing the young Xavier to not only see Logan's memories but also briefly communicate with his future self, Logan's projected mind acting as a psychic 'bridge' between the past and the future. The older Xavier convinces his younger self to maintain his faith that humanity can rise above its mistakes rather than judge it by when it stumbles despite the future he lives in. He offers his young self advice on how to get past the fear of emotional pain that is hindering his powers by telling him that he can accept the pain of others by focusing on the hope for a better future. The older Xavier also allows his young counterpart to see his memories, which include the differences he had made in his students.

Free from his self-doubts and aware of the impending crisis, the young Xavier subsequently stops using the serum to regain his telepathy and is determined to stop the dystopian future and save Mystique from damnation. Although Magneto nearly triggers a mass slaughter when he takes control of the Sentinels during their demonstration in Washington, D.C., Mystique knocks him out in time, followed by Xavier appealing to her to not assassinate Trask. As a result of the changed past and the knowledge Xavier has gained from both Wolverine and his future self, he is able to change the outcome of the next 50 years. All of the X-Men (including Cyclops and Jean Grey, who had previously died in X-Men: The Last Stand), are alive in the altered future timeline. In addition, he and Logan are the only two who are aware of the details of changes they have made toward the timeline's continuity.

Archival footage of Laurence Belcher from X-Men: First Class was used in this film.

Revised timeline

X-Men: Apocalypse 

McAvoy reprises his role as Xavier in X-Men: Apocalypse. McAvoy stated in an interview with The Huffington Post that he would be older and would lose his hair in the film. During the film, it is stated that Xavier believes that humans and mutants have now achieved peace, prompting him to focus on building up the Institute as a more conventional school, intending to bring humans into the school as well as mutants, although Beast and Mystique each make preparations for a future conflict to prepare for the worst even if Beast wants to hope. He has started teaching the young Jean Grey (Sophie Turner), trying to help her develop more gradual control of her powers without the telepathic blocks of the original timeline. The storyline also sees his first meeting with Cyclops (Tye Sheridan) in the altered timeline after Cyclops's powers emerge during an argument with a bully at school. When Xavier hears rumors of an ancient mutant, he makes contact with a new foe, Apocalypse (Oscar Isaac), while using Cerebro. This allows Apocalypse to take remote control of Xavier's telepathy and use him to make the governments launch all their nuclear missiles, before teleporting to the mansion to abduct Xavier. Although Apocalypse forces Xavier to transmit a telepathic message to the human race by enhancing his powers (proclaiming Apocalypse's intentions to launch a plan of conquest against the world) Xavier uses the opportunity to transmit a private message to Jean with his location, and concludes the message by telling those with power to protect those without rather than to prepare for conquest.

Apocalypse attempts to use his equipment to transfer his essence into Xavier's body, allowing him to gain full access to Xavier's telepathy. Although the energy shield of the transference burns off Xavier's hair as he tries to escape, he is finally rescued by Nightcrawler (Kodi Smit-McPhee) before the process can be completed. During the later conflict, Xavier uses the still-existing telepathic link between himself and Apocalypse to attack the latter on the psychic plane while the other X-Men confront him in the real world. In the end, Xavier is only a distraction until Jean can unleash her own full power. At the end of the film, Xavier is bald and wearing his usual suit as he sits outside the Danger Room, watching the new X-Men prepare for training under Mystique as their new field leader.

Logan 

Stewart reprises his role as Xavier in Logan. In 2029, most of the X-Men have been inadvertently killed by Xavier in a seizure-induced mental attack one year earlier, and the mutant population is dwindling because of the Transigen virus. Professor X is in his 90s, and has Alzheimer's disease, causing him to lose control of his very strong telepathic abilities via seizures. Logan and Caliban (Stephen Merchant) act as Xavier's protectors and caretakers. Xavier senses the presence of another mutant in Texas named Laura (Dafne Keen) who has a lot in common with Logan, and the two decide to help keep her safe from Pierce (Boyd Holbrook) and the Reavers who are trying to capture her. They drive toward North Dakota as Laura's previous caretaker informed them of a mutant safe haven located nearby. They take shelter at a hotel in Oklahoma City. However, when the Reavers catch up to them and enter their hotel room, Xavier has another seizure, causing him to telepathically freeze everyone in the area until Logan gives him a suppressant. The trio is eventually given shelter by a farming family, the Munsons, after Charles secretly helps them round up their horses during a highway incident. When the Munsons offer them a meal and a place to stay for the night, Xavier tells Logan the importance of life and family before going to sleep. Later that night, while Logan is away, Xavier realizes the truth about what he did to the X-Men and confesses his guilt to a man he thinks is Logan, but is revealed to be X-24, a perfect clone of Logan, who fatally stabs Charles and kills the Munsons. Logan desperately tries to save Xavier, but to no avail. His last words are the name of the boat they were going to buy: "The Sunseeker". Logan eventually manages to escape with Laura and Xavier's body, and later, tearfully buries him near an isolated lake.

Deadpool 2 

In a very brief cameo, McAvoy plays Xavier in Deadpool 2, as Stewart was too busy in other projects to reprise his role. After Wade Wilson / Deadpool is brought back to the X-Mansion, he loudly questions and remarks to Colossus where the other mutants are, as he always only sees him or Negasonic Teenage Warhead at the mansion. Xavier, Beast and other X-Men are briefly shown behind a sliding wooden door, which is quietly closed in order to hide from Deadpool.

Dark Phoenix 

McAvoy reprises his role as young Xavier in 2019's Dark Phoenix. When the film begins, set in the early 1990s, the X-Men are enjoying a period of acceptance as public heroes, to the point that the President calls them for assistance in dealing with a shuttle accident, although Mystique expresses concern that Xavier is more focused on their current celebrity status than his original goal of coexistence between mutants and humans. The situation becomes dangerous when Jean absorbs a mysterious space anomaly that almost destroys the shuttle, elevating her already-formidable powers and compromising her mental state. Jean discovers that her father is still alive after having been told by Xavier that she had killed her parents in a car accident caused by her powers activating. However, her father had neglected to remain a part of her life. The traumatized Jean destroys her father's house and accidentally kills Mystique, which leads to Beast rejecting Xavier to join Magneto in seeking revenge on Jean for Mystique's death. When an alien race confronts Jean with the goal of draining her new power to allow them to terraform Earth into their new homeworld, the X-Men come back together to protect her. This show of solidarity helps her achieve a new sense of mental stability before she departs Earth. The film ends with Beast taking over as headmaster of the school while Xavier decides to 'retire' for a time. The final scene shows him playing chess with Magneto in Paris as they contemplate their new future.

Alternate versions

Legion 

Harry Lloyd portrays an alternate young Xavier in the 2019 third and final season of Legion. When the series begins, David Haller learns that he was adopted by the family that raised him and eventually deduces that his real father fought Amahl Farouk on the astral plane, but had to give his son up for adoption to protect him from the entity. During Farouk's interrogation of David's adopted sister regarding his real father, a glimpse of Xavier's wheelchair (from the X-Men films) is shown. In the third season, a now-supervillain cult leader David uses the mutant "Switch" to travel back in time to prevent his parents from giving him up for adoption: Xavier is shown to have met David's mother Gabrielle when she was originally in a catatonic state at a mental hospital following her time in concentration camps during World War II; after reviving her with his telepathy, the couple fell in love, and had David. In the alternate timeline resulting from David's interference, he attempts to convince his father of Farouk being evil, only for the Farouk's future self to reveal David's true nature to Xavier in calm conversation, encouraging him not to give him up for adoption and leave his younger self be to peacefully reign, showing them visions of what would happen to them should they consider evil. Content, Xavier returns to Gabrielle and embraces the younger David, as the older David and Farouk fade out of existence.

Doctor Strange in the Multiverse of Madness 

On Earth-838, Charles Xavier is the leader of the Illuminati, a group of enhanced individuals that monitors the multiverse for threats. He and the group hold Stephen Strange accountable for his actions against the multiverse, with Xavier advocating Strange to be spared, before they are interrupted by the Wanda Maximoff of Earth-616, who has possessed her Earth-838 counterpart. While Maximoff massacres the Illuminati, Xavier encourages Strange to locate the Book of Vishanti, locked away by 838-Strange before his death, to use it against Maximoff, before telepathically taking over her mind to try to communicate with and free her Earth-838 counterpart. Maximoff takes back control and subsequently kills Xavier by tearing his head in half, the psychic shock of which kills him in the real world by making his neck snap, leading Xavier to drop dead on his chair.

Accolades
Both Stewart and McAvoy have been nominated for awards for their performances in the role.

References

British superheroes
Fictional British people
Fictional characters from New York City
Fictional characters with dementia
Fictional characters with disabilities
Fictional characters with eidetic memory
Fictional characters with paraplegia
Fictional human rights activists
Fictional immigrants to the United States
Fictional murdered people
Fictional murderers
Fictional pacifists
Fictional principals and headteachers
Fictional professors
Fictional twins
Fictional University of Oxford people
Film characters introduced in 2000
Male characters in film
Marvel Cinematic Universe characters
Marvel Comics American superheroes
Marvel Comics characters who have mental powers
Marvel Comics mutants
Marvel Comics scientists
Marvel Comics telekinetics
Marvel Comics telepaths
Superhero schoolteachers
Wolverine (film series)
X-Men (film series) characters
X-Men members